Green Creative LLC is a Silicon Valley-based company that manufactures and develops solid state LED lighting. In October 2017, they were acquired by Harbor Group.

History
In 2009, after four years of living in China, Cole Zucker returned to the U.S. At the time, LED was just entering the U.S. market as a viable replacement technology. He then co-founded the company with Guillaume Vidal in 2010 and launched commercial operations in 2011.

The company developed and patented various technologies and utilized a strong integrated R&D. The development was cited by the Illuminating Engineering Society Progress Report, the LEDs Magazine Sapphire Awards, Edison Report and NAILD among others.

In 2013, Green Creative was ranked #213 on the Inc 5000 fastest growing private companies, generating $39.6 million, a 1,824.5% growth over 3 years.

In October 2017, Green Creative was acquired by Harbor Group for an undisclosed sum.

References

External links
Official website

Companies based in Silicon Valley